General Holland may refer to:

Arthur Holland (British Army officer) (1862–1927), British Army lieutenant general
Charles R. Holland (born 1946), U.S. Air Force general
Diana M. Holland (fl. 1990s–2020s), U.S. Army major general
Leonard Holland (1916–1999), U.S. Army major general